The Cedar Rapids River Kings are a professional indoor football team based in Cedar Rapids, Iowa. The River Kings joined the Indoor Football League (IFL) as an expansion team in 2011 as the Cedar Rapids Titans and first took the field for the 2012 season. The River Kings will not rejoin the Indoor Football League (IFL) in 2024.

Since 2014, the Titans/River Kings franchise has played its home games at the newly renovated Alliant Energy PowerHouse, after having played their first two seasons at the Cedar Rapids Ice Arena.

The Titans were the first indoor team to be based in Cedar Rapids. The Titans have appeared in two United Conference championship games (2013, 2014), losing to the Sioux Falls Storm both times.

During the 2018 season, the Titans were sold to new ownership and announced that they would rebrand for 2019 with a name-the-team contest, eventually taking on the Cedar Rapids River Kings name.

Due to the effects of the COVID-19 pandemic, the River Kings went dormant for at least the 2021 season. The team website was deactivated in 2020 and the team was not included as a 2022 league member.

Franchise history

2012 – Titans

In August 2011, it was announced that the Cedar Rapids Titans would become an expansion team of the Indoor Football League for the 2012 season owned by Chris Kokalis, Bob Sullivan and Kenneth Moninski. Titans' general manager, Chris Kolalis stated, "We believe that Cedar Rapids is a fantastic market to bring a team into. We hope to promote economic development and be a part of the growth of the community by being active and giving back to the fans." The team also announced that they would play their home games at the Cedar Rapids Ice Arena, with the intentions to play in the newly renovated, U.S. Cellular Center in 2013. On November 18, 2011, the Titans hired former NFL player, Kyle Moore-Brown, as the first coach in franchise history. They won their inaugural game on March 3, 2012 with a 32–13 win over Lehigh Valley Steelhawks.

2013

The Titans lost their pre-season warm-up against Green Bay but began the 2013 regular season with three straight wins in a home-and-home series with Chicago and hosting the new Texas Revolution franchise out of Allen. After a two-week bye, the team lost its next three games. The Titans recovered from this stumble and finished the season second in the United Conference with a 9–5 record. They made the post-season but lost to the Sioux Falls Storm in the United Conference Championship. The team fared much better at home than on the road with 5 of its 6 losses coming when it was away from the Cedar Rapids Ice Arena.

2014

The Titans were one of eight returning teams plus one expansion team for the 2014 Indoor Football League season. After a 38–47 loss to open the 2014 season, the Titans went on to win their next 8 games in a row. The Titans entered Week 12, with a chance to claim first place in the United Conference, but fell 36–48 to the undefeated Storm. The Titans avenged the loss during the final game of the season, defeating the Storm 49–37. The victory placed the Titans in second place in the United Conference, and ended the Storm's undefeated season. The Titans' 2nd-place finish meant a road playoff game against the Storm in the United Conference Finals, where they were defeated 36–73.

2015

The Titans were tasked with replacing 2014 starting quarterback Spencer Ohm, while also losing the IFL's leading rusher, LaRon Council. The team signed Sam Durley, from the defunct Wyoming Cavalry, to be their new starting quarterback. Durley got the Titans off to a 6–3 start, good enough for second place in the United Conference, but he was released on May 4, 2015 to sign with the New Orleans VooDoo. However, just two weeks prior to Durley's release, the Titans had traded for the 2014 IFL MVP, Willie Copeland. Jeremiah Price was named the Defensive Player of the Year.

2016

The Titans were yet again looking for a quarterback heading into 2016. The team selected Dylan Favre (quarterback for the national team from the 2015 Football World Cup and the nephew of Brett Favre) to lead the team. Favre finished 6th in the league in passing touchdowns and 5 in passing yards as the Titans finished the season 12–4, clinching the 2 seed in the United Conference. The Titans won their first playoff game in team history with a 66–36 victory over the Wichita Falls Nighthawks, but were once again defeated by the Sioux Falls Storm 48–41 in the United Conference Championship. Price repeated as the Defensive Player of the Year.

2017

The Titans hired former Iowa Hawkeyes wide receiver, Marvin McNutt as the third coach in team history.

2018

After the 2017 season, head coach McNutt took over as general manager and hired Billy Back, the 2016 IFL coach of the year with the Wichita Falls Nighthawks, as the new head coach. However, coach Back would leave the team a couple of months after his hiring to coach the expansion Carolina Cobras of the National Arena League for the 2018 season. The Titans then hired former NFL linebacker Marvin Jones as his replacement.

On January 30, 2018, the Titans' ownership announced the team was for sale with hopes of selling to new local ownership. In June, it was announced that the Titans had been sold to Roy Choi, a California-based businessman, with the intentions of keeping the team Cedar Rapids.

River Kings
In a letter to fans posted on the team's website on August 17, 2018, new general manager Ryan Eucker announced that the Titans' name and identity would be replaced as part of a rebranding process after the ownership change.  On August 20, 2018, Eucker announced a name-the-team contest to select a new team name and identity with submissions due by September 5. On September 22, the team announced their new name as the Cedar Rapids River Kings with a new logo and color scheme to be unveiled by mid-October.  On September 25, 2018, general manager Ryan Eucker announced that Mark Stoute had returned as the head coach of the River Kings.  He coached the Titans from 2013 to 2016. A few games into the season, general manager Eucker was sent by the new owner to his other IFL team, the San Diego Strike Force, to take over as general manager. Reggie Harris was promoted to the River Kings' general manager.

The River Kings finished with a 1–13 record and head coach Stoute was fired after the season. Victor Mann was brought in as head coach after his previous team, the Texas Revolution, had folded the previous season.

The River Kings participated in one of the two league games that were completed in the 2020 season before the entire league's season was curtailed during the COVID-19 pandemic. The team also withdrew from the league's 2021 season. The league did not list the River Kings as a member for 2022 season and will not return to the IFL in 2024.

Players

Roster

All-IFL players
The following Titans/River Kings players have been named to All-IFL Teams:
RB LaRon Council (2)
WR Carl Sims, Bryan Pray (2), Damond Powell
OL Maurice Robinson, Albert Erni, Jr., A. J. Harmon
DL Xzavie Jackson (4), Kyle Jenkins, Jeremiah Price (2)
LB Nikolas Sierra
DB T. J. Simmons, Ricky Johnson
K Rockne Belmonte (2), Nicholas Belcher
KR Robert Brown, Demetruce McNeal

Individual awards
The following is a list of all Titans/River Kings players who have won league awards

Staff

Statistics and records

Season-by-season results

Head coach records
Note: Statistics are correct through the end of the 2020 Indoor Football League season.

References

External links
Cedar Rapids River Kings official website

 
2011 establishments in Iowa